The National Basketball League Most Valuable Player Award (MVP) is an annual National Basketball League (NBL) award given since the league's inaugural season to the best performing player of the regular season. Throughout the year, coaching staff from each team vote on the best performing players in every game, using a 5-4-3-2-1 system at the completion of each match. The votes are collated and the individual with the most votes at the end of the regular season is awarded the Most Valuable Player. The winner receives the Andrew Gaze Trophy, which is named in honour of Australian basketball legend Andrew Gaze, a seven-time winner of the NBL MVP award.

Winners

Multi-time winners

See also
 List of National Basketball League (Australia) awards
 New Zealand NBL Most Valuable Player Award

References

External links
NBL MVPs 1979–2001
2023 NBL MVP preview at nbl.com.au

Most Valuable Player
Basketball most valuable player awards
Awards established in 1979